The 2022–23 season is the 115th in the history of LASK and their sixth consecutive season in the top flight. The club will participate in Austrian Football Bundesliga and the Austrian Cup.

Players

Out on loan

Transfers

Pre-season and friendlies

Competitions

Overall record

Austrian Football Bundesliga

League table

Results summary 

{{Fb rs footer|u=19 March 2023 |s=Austrian Football Bundesliga |date=July 2023))

Results by round

Matches 
The league fixtures were announced on 22 June 2022.

Austrian Cup

References 

LASK seasons
LASK